Rod Steiger was an American actor who had an extensive career in film, television, and stage. He made his stage debut in 1946 with Civic Repertory Theatre's production of the melodrama Curse you, Jack Dalton!. Four years later, he played onstage in a production of An Enemy of the People at the Music Box Theatre. A small role in Fred Zinnemann's Teresa (1951) marked his film debut. In 1953, he played the title role in the teleplay "Marty" (two years before the film starring Ernest Borgnine) to critical praise. His breakthrough role came with the crime drama On the Waterfront (1954), which earned him an Academy Award for Best Supporting Actor nomination, and subsequent appearance in Fred Zinnemann's musical Oklahoma!.

Steiger played a crooked promoter who hires a sports journalist in the Mark Robson-directed film noir The Harder They Fall (1956). In the 1957 British thriller Across the Bridge, he portrayed a German con-artist on the run in Mexico. The following year, he played a psychopathic criminal in Andrew L. Stone's thriller Cry Terror!. He played gangster Al Capone in the 1959 Richard Wilson-directed biopic of same name, and was cast in the role of a destroyer commander in the epic war film The Longest Day (1962). For playing a survivor of the Holocaust in the drama The Pawnbroker (1964), he garnered a BAFTA Award for Best Actor in a Leading Role, and nominations for the Academy Award and Golden Globe Award in the same category. The following year, he was cast in the role of a ruthless Russian politician Doctor Zhivago, which was the biggest box-office success of the 1960s, and was included in AFI's 100 Years...100 Movies. He won an Academy, a BAFTA and a Golden Globe Award for Best Actor for Norman Jewison's mystery drama In the Heat of the Night (1967). He played a serial killer in the black comedy thriller No Way to Treat a Lady (1968), and ended the decade with the box-office flop Three into Two Won't Go (1969).

During the 1970s, Steiger starred in foreign productions and independent films in search of more demanding roles. His roles during the period include Waterloo (1970), Duck, You Sucker! (1971), Last Days of Mussolini  (1975), W. C. Fields and Me (1976), Pontius Pilate in Jesus of Nazareth (1977 TV miniseries), F.I.S.T. (1978) and The Amityville Horror (1979). After suffering a heart attack in 1979 and undergoing surgery, his poor health and subsequent depression took its toll on Steiger's career, and he was forced to appear in low-budget B movies. Though he was nominated for Genie Award for Best Performance by a Foreign Actor for his roles in the Canadian productions Klondike Fever and The Lucky Star in 1980, and won the Montréal World Film Festival Award for Best Actor for Jeremy Kagan's The Chosen (1981). His subsequent roles were mainly in low-budget films. In 1989 he played authority figures in two films—a mayor in The January Man and a judge in Tennessee Waltz.

In 1990, Steiger starred in Men of Respect, an adaptation of William Shakespeare's play Macbeth. Steiger's role in the critically panned thriller opposite Sylvester Stallone The Specialist (1994) earned him a nomination for the Golden Raspberry Award for Worst Supporting Actor. Steiger appeared in both Shiloh (1995) and the sequel, three years later. He reunited with Jewison on the biopic The Hurricane in 1999, in which he portrayed judge H. Lee Sarokin. He was one of the leads in the drama film The Last Producer (2000), before starring in his final film, the drama thriller Poolhall Junkies (2002).

Film

Television

Stage

References

Bibliography

External links
 
 
 Rod Steiger at the British Film Institute

Male actor filmographies
American filmographies